Eduardo Jumisse commonly known as Jumisse (born June 6, 1984 in Maputo, Mozambique) is a Mozambican footballer who  plays as an attacking midfielder.

Honours

Liga Muçulmana Maputo
Championship of Mozambique: 2010
Primeiro de Agosto
Angolan League: 2016
UD Songo
Championship of Mozambique: 2017

References

External links

Living people
1984 births
Mozambican footballers
Association football midfielders
Mozambique international footballers
Primeira Liga players
Liga I players
Cypriot First Division players
C.D. Primeiro de Agosto players
Leixões S.C. players
Portimonense S.C. players
FC Vaslui players
Ermis Aradippou FC players
Sportspeople from Maputo
Mozambican expatriate footballers
Expatriate footballers in Portugal
Expatriate footballers in Romania
Expatriate footballers in Cyprus
Expatriate footballers in Angola
Mozambican expatriate sportspeople in Portugal
Mozambican expatriate sportspeople in Romania
Mozambican expatriate sportspeople in Cyprus
Mozambican expatriate sportspeople in Angola
Liga Desportiva de Maputo players
Gil Vicente F.C. players
C.F. União players
C.D. Cinfães players
Clube Ferroviário de Nampula players